Biskohar bazar is a town and market in Itwa block in Sidhdharthnagar district, Basti division, Uttar Pradesh state of India. Biskohar is situated 209 km from the State's Capital City Lucknow.

Administration
There is one Parliamentary constituency named Domariaganj and five Assembly constituencies in the district namely Domariaganj, Itwa, Shoratgarh, Kapilvastu and Bansi. Biskohar comes under Itwa (Assembly constituency). MLA (Member of Legislative Assembly of the Itwa constituencies is: Mata Prasad Pandey, and Member of Parliament is Shri Jagdambika Pal from Bharatiya Janata Party.

External links
Uplegasssemby.nic.in
SBI- Biskohar
Purvanchal Gramin Bank
Population of Biskohar
गरीबी की वजह से ही मैं यहां तक पहुंचा: विश्वनाथ त्रिपाठी
365 मंदिर व कुओं का ऐतिहासिक कस्बा बिस्कोहर
इटवा को मिलेगा बस स्टाप का तोहफा
इटवा व बिस्कोहर नगर पंचायत में ईओ की तैनाती

References

Cities and towns in Siddharthnagar district